Émerson Leão (born 11 July 1949) is a Brazilian former footballer and manager. He is regarded by pundits as one of best Brazilian goalkeepers of all time. A documentary video produced by FIFA, FIFA Fever, called him the third-most impressive defense player of all time. He was born in Ribeirão Preto, São Paulo.

Playing career

He was a FIFA World Cup champion in 1970 as a reserve player, at age 20. He then played the two following World Cups as first team player. He was the first Brazilian goalkeeper in history to be team captain (during the 1978 World Cup). Dida repeated the feat in 2006 in a group stage match against Japan. In the 1986 World Cup, Leão was a reserve player.

He played 80 times for the Brazil national football team. At club level, he played for several clubs, his longest term being at Palmeiras, where he won several titles, like Campeonato Brasileiro and Campeonato Paulista.

Managerial career
Leão has been a manager since 1987. He was São Paulo manager in 2005, winning the Campeonato Paulista of that year. He then moved to Vissel Kobe of Japan, where he stayed for only four matches. On 18 July 2005, he became the manager of Palmeiras, a position he held until March 2006. His peak as a manager was his second period at Santos, between 2002 and 2004, when he won the Campeonato Brasileiro in 2002, and was runner-up in both Copa Libertadores de América and Campeonato Brasileiro in 2003. Leão is often seen as a hardliner, since he demands perfect physical shape of his players, along with discipline and mutual respect. He is not fond of having well-known players on his teams, since he believes that this might cause relationship problems within the squad.

He was the manager of the Brazil nation team from 15 November 2000 until 9 June 2001. From 11 matches, his Brazil side won 4, drew 4 and lost 3. Like his predecessor Vanderlei Luxemburgo, he struggled having top players available for qualifying matches. He tried to centre the squad around Romário and younger players with little international experience. He also became the first sitting coach to travel to Europe to assess his players' activities there, where he was asked by the Europeans to not release Rivaldo and Roberto Carlos for matches that were not crucial.

Leão was dismissed by Atlético Mineiro on 4 May 2009 following a defeat to arch-rivals Cruzeiro in the final of a regional championship. This ended his third stint as Atlético head coach. On 3 June 2009, Sport Recife's have signed the coach for the up-coming 2009 Brasileirão championship. On 26 April 2010, Leão was named as the new manager of Goiás. On 24 October 2011, São Paulo announced it had hired Leão for a second managerial spell in charge of the club.

On 30 August 2012, after two months unattached, Leão was hired by São Caetano, then participating in Série B.

Controversies
Leão is known for his controversial attitudes and declarations.

In 1997, after a game between his Atlético Mineiro and Argentine side Lanús in the Conmebol Cup final, Leão was involved in a massive fight with adversaries. Leão had to rebuild his face after the incident.

In 2002, when he coached Santos, and Peixe faced Paysandu, Leão was involved again in a fight. This time, when his players faced policemen, the coach received an aggression in his eyes by a pepper spray.

In 2006, then coaching Palmeiras, Leão had problems with television pundit Milton Neves, that had kicked another television pundit, Sílvio Luiz, according to Leão. Leão said to Neves: "When you kicked Silvio Luiz's ass, a 70-year-old man, you boasted. Come to kick mine!"

In 2010, training Goiás, Leão discussed again with two another television pundits, Renata Fan and Neto. According to Leão, Neto "would not have psychological conditions to speak in a television channel". But the problems between them would happen since 1989, when Leão coached Neto in Palmeiras.

In 2013, in research made for sportive site UOL Esporte, Leão was elected the worst coach from Brazil. He had 16 votes. Celso Roth was chosen the second one.

Again in 2013, Leão said that Juvenal Juvêncio, president of São Paulo, club that he coached for two times (between 2004 and 2005 and, after, between 2011 and 2012), should abdicate, for his age, of his position, making like pope Benedict XVI. Juvêncio answered to Leão, saying that the coach "needs to find another job soon".

Career statistics

Club

International

Managerial

Honours

Player
Club
Palmeiras
1969 – Campeonato Brasileiro and Ramón de Carranza Trophy 
1972 – Campeonato Paulista and Campeonato Brasileiro 
1973 – Campeonato Brasileiro 
1974 – Campeonato Paulista and Ramón de Carranza Trophy 
1976 – Campeonato Paulista
1978 – Campeonato Brasileiro runner-up

Vasco
1979 – Campeonato Brasileiro runner-up

Grêmio
1980 – Campeonato Gaúcho
1981 – Campeonato Brasileiro
1982 – Campeonato Brasileiro runner-up

Corinthians
1983 – Campeonato Paulista

Sport
1987 – Campeonato Brasileiro

Internacional

1970 – 1970 FIFA World Cup in Mexico

Manager
Sport
2000 – Campeonato Pernambucano

Shimizu S Pulse
1992 – Kanagawa Cup

Verdy Kawasaki
1996 – Emperor's Cup

Atlético Mineiro
1997 – Copa Conmebol

Santos
1998 – Copa Conmebol 
2002 – Campeonato Brasileiro

São Paulo
2005 – Campeonato Paulista

Individual
1972 – Bola de Prata - Best Goalkeeper
1979 – FIFA XI

See also
List of Brazil national football team managers

References

Enciclopédia do Futebol Brasileiro, Volume 2 – Lance, Rio de Janeiro: Aretê Editorial S/A, 2001.
Seleção Brasileira – 90 Anos – Rio de Janeiro: MAUAD, 2004.

External links
 
 Sambafoot – Leão's career as a manager

People from Ribeirão Preto
Brazilian footballers
Association football goalkeepers
1970 FIFA World Cup players
1974 FIFA World Cup players
1978 FIFA World Cup players
1986 FIFA World Cup players
1979 Copa América players
1983 Copa América players
FIFA World Cup-winning players
Brazil international footballers
Campeonato Brasileiro Série A players
1949 births
Living people
Brazilian football managers
Expatriate football managers in Qatar
Expatriate football managers in Japan
Campeonato Brasileiro Série A managers
Campeonato Brasileiro Série B managers
J1 League managers
2001 FIFA Confederations Cup managers
Comercial Futebol Clube (Ribeirão Preto) players
Sociedade Esportiva Palmeiras players
CR Vasco da Gama players
Grêmio Foot-Ball Porto Alegrense players
Sport Club Corinthians Paulista players
Sport Club do Recife players
Sport Club do Recife managers
Coritiba Foot Ball Club managers
Sociedade Esportiva Palmeiras managers
Associação Portuguesa de Desportos managers
São José Esporte Clube managers
Esporte Clube XV de Novembro (Piracicaba) managers
Shimizu S-Pulse managers
Esporte Clube Juventude managers
Club Athletico Paranaense managers
Tokyo Verdy managers
Clube Atlético Mineiro managers
Santos FC managers
Sport Club Internacional managers
Grêmio Foot-Ball Porto Alegrense managers
Brazil national football team managers
Cruzeiro Esporte Clube managers
São Paulo FC managers
Vissel Kobe managers
Associação Desportiva São Caetano managers
Sport Club Corinthians Paulista managers
Al Sadd SC managers
Goiás Esporte Clube managers
Footballers from São Paulo (state)